The Nissan 126X is a concept car built by Nissan in 1970.

Design 
The 126X features an angular, wedge design like many other concept cars of the time. It has a strip of lights along the hood that light up with either 3 red, 2 yellow, or 5 green lights depending on whether the vehicle is braking, at constant speed, or accelerating respectively. Similar strips were also included on the rear sides. It also features a front hinged canopy door that encompasses the roof, windscreen and the panels down to the sills.

Specifications 
The 126X is powered by a transverse-mounted Nissan L-series, 3.0-liter 6-cylinder engine sending power to all four wheels. There is, however, no evidence that the 126X was actually roadworthy. Despite its wedge design, the 126X was a four seater.

Nissan 126X in miniature 
A model of the 126X, badged as the "Datsun 126X", was produced by Matchbox from 1973 to 1985, debuting as number 33 in their 1-75 series.

References 

126X
Cars introduced in 1970
Rear mid-engine, all-wheel-drive vehicles